Ban Hafiz Jee is a village and union council of Mianwali District in the Punjab province of Pakistan and is located in Mianwali Tehsil.

References

Union councils of Mianwali District